Ma Jianjun (born 8 October 1984 in Baise, Guangxi) is a male Chinese water polo player who was part of the gold medal winning team at the 2007 National Championships. He competed at the 2008 Summer Olympics.

See also
 List of men's Olympic water polo tournament goalkeepers

References

1984 births
Living people
Chinese male water polo players
Water polo goalkeepers
Olympic water polo players of China
People from Baise
Water polo players at the 2008 Summer Olympics
Sportspeople from Guangxi